Ghioroc is a commune in Arad County, Romania.

Population
According to the 2011 census, the commune contained 3,667 inhabitants, out of which 81.2% were Romanians, 17.1% Hungarians, 0.7% Ukrainians, 0.5% Germans, 0.3% Roma and 0.2% are of other or undeclared nationalities.

Natives
 Silvia Sorina Munteanu, opera singer

History
The first documentary record of Ghioroc dates back to 1135. Cuvin was attested documentarily in 1323, while Miniș in 1302.

Economy
The economy of the locality is mainly agricultural, both component sectors are well developed. The commune is known as an important vine-growing centre both in the country and abroad, although few tourists visit the area.

Tourism
Among the show-places of Ghioroc commune we can mention the Roman Catholic church from 1779–1781, the Orthodox church with its patron saint called "Sfântul Mucenic Dimitrie" dating back to 1793, the monument put up to the heroes killed in the battles in 1944, the Museum of Vine and Wine, as well as the Agricole Museum. Beside these, Ghioroc Lake is another attractive place. Unfortunately, the village is spoilt by unrestricted use of the local roads by heavy trucks using the nearby sandpits. This is leading to serious damage to the local roads, and structural damage to many local buildings. Although there are weight and speed limits on these roads, no attempt is made to enforce them by local police. Some attempts have been made improve local facilities using EU money, such as a 'park' close to the local lake, but this has also failed due to lack of provision for maintenance, or poor planning and execution.

References

Communes in Arad County
Localities in Crișana